Vitrea striata is a species of small, air-breathing land snail, a terrestrial pulmonate gastropod mollusk in the family Pristilomatidae.

This species is endemic to Spain.

References

Pristilomatidae
Endemic molluscs of the Iberian Peninsula
Endemic fauna of the Balearic Islands
Gastropods described in 1988
Taxonomy articles created by Polbot